Ferula foetida is a species of Ferula native to Central Asia (Kyzylkum Desert, Karakum Desert, Turkmenistan), Eastern Iran, western Afghanistan and western Pakistan. It is the most widely distributed species that produces asafoetida. It is often mistaken for the Southern Iranian species F. assa-foetida, for example, in Flora of the U.S.S.R. and Flora of Pakistan.

References 

foetida
Flora of Iran
Flora of Afghanistan
Flora of Pakistan
Flora of Turkmenistan
Flora of Uzbekistan
Flora of Kazakhstan
Taxa named by Alexander von Bunge